3HO (Healthy, Happy, Holy Organization), also known as Sikh Dharma of the Western Hemisphere or Sikh Dharma International, is an American organization that started in 1969. It was founded in the West by Harbhajan Singh Khalsa, also called "Yogi Bhajan"- Its followers are primarily Americans. Its adherents are popularly referred to as the Sikh Dharma Brotherhood. While referred to as the 3HO movement, "3HO" is strictly speaking the name only of the movement's educational branch.

Practices

The 3HO movement is known for including some practices found in certain traditions of Hinduism, such as meditation, vegetarianism and yoga, particularly Kundalini yoga. 3HO also believes openness to yoga and spiritual ideas as a source of strength. Both men and women wear turbans and often wear white clothes.

3HO requires its members to follow a strict lacto-vegetarian diet. The use of alcohol, recreational drugs and tobacco is forbidden.

Reception
In 1977, Gurucharan Singh Tohra, former President of the Shiromani Gurdwara Parbandhak Committee (SGPC), stated that Harbhajan Singh was not the leader of Sikhism in the Western World as he claimed, and denied Singh's claim that the SGPC had given him the title of Siri Singh Sahib.

3HO is not representative of the actual Sikh religion or its teachings, and is often denounced by orthodox Sikhs for having cultish and capitalistic characteristics that are not representative of the original faith.

Governance and control

Yogi Bhajan formed Sikh Dharma International as a California nonprofit religious corporation "organized to advance the religion of Sikh Dharma and as an association of religious organizations teaching principles of Sikh Dharma, including by ordination of ministers of divinity and operation of places of worship." During Yogi Bhajan's lifetime, Sikh Dharma International, along with related legal entities Siri Singh Sahib Corporation and Unto Infinity LLC, were held and controlled by Siri Singh Sahib of Sikh Dharma, a California "corporation sole" of which Yogi Bhajan was the only shareholder. Following the Yogi's death in 2004, a dispute ensued over the governance of those entities and assets. Yogi Bhajan's wife, Bibiji Inderjit Kaur Puri, alleged that she had been appointed to the board of Unto Infinity, and that she and their three children were appointed to the Siri Singh Sahib of Sikh Dharma board of directors (and thus in a position to exert significant control over all of the Sikh Dharma legal entities); but that following Yogi Bhajan's death the other board members of those entities improperly prevented them from taking part in governance. In January 2017, the 9th Circuit Court of Appeals determined that the lawsuit was not on its face an ecclesiastical dispute. However, in April 2018, Chief Judge Michael Mosman of the U.S. District Court for the District of Oregon dismissed the case. Judge Mosman concluded that there was significant evidence that the 3HO corporate entities were religious in character and thus that the dispute could not be adjudicated in civil court.

At present, Sikh Dharma International is governed by the Khalsa Council appointed by the Siri Singh Sahib, Yogi Bhajan. The Council is composed of Golden Temple CEO Kartar Singh Khalsa; his domestic partner, Peraim Kaur Khalsa, who was also a member of Yogi Bhajan's personal staff; Sikh Dharma's longtime comptroller, Sopurkh Kaur Khalsa; and the organization's strategic and legal planner, Siri Karm Kaur Khalsa, a New Mexico resident. The Khalsa Council does not recognize Yogi Bhajan's family as members of the organization or its governing group. The Khalsa Council appoints a Board of Directors for Sikh Dharma International.  the current Board of Directors comprises Siri Sikdar Sahiba, Sardarni Guru Amrit Kaur Khalsa, MA; Bhai Sahiba, Bibiji Inderjit Kaur Khalsa, PhD; MSS Guru Raj Kaur Khalsa; SS Guru Darbar Singh Khalsa; Sada Sat Simran Singh Khalsa; SS SatSundri Kaur Khalsa; SS Siri Karm Singh Khalsa; and Board chairman MSS Kirtan-Singh Khalsa. SS SatSundri Kaur Khalsa also provides oversight of the associated Sikh businesses of Yogi Tea and Akal Security.

Business ventures

According to anthropology professor and Sikh diaspora researcher Nicola Mooney, 3HO Sikhs have combined "ethic and capitalism" to their spiritual pursuits, with Sikh Dharma International and its associated corporate entities and directors creating and controlling the Yogi Tea and Akal Security brands with a worldwide presence. 

Golden Temple of Oregon, a natural foods company that built the Peace Cereal and Yogi Tea brands, was owned by a corporate entity controlled by Yogi Bhajan, and was estimated to be worth around $100,000,000 at the time of his death. The company was transferred to Kartar Singh Khalsa for $100, sparking lawsuits over improper disposition of the assets. Golden Temple's cereal division was sold to Hearthside Food Solutions in May 2010 for $71 million; the executives were later ordered to return more than half of the sale price to a court-appointed receiver. Hearthside was later acquired by Post. Golden Temple was renamed East West Tea Company after that sale.

Another SDI-related company, Akal Security, initially hired 3HO members to guard shops and restaurants. It grew into a $500 million-a-year company with federal contracts to protect numerous government buildings in Washington, DC and elsewhere, including courthouses, airports, and embassies. The founders donated the company to the church in 1980.

Following the death of Yogi Bhajan, control over Golden Temple and Akal Security was contested in a series of lawsuits in Oregon.

References

Further reading 
 Elsberg, Constance. Graceful Women: Gender and Identity in an American Sikh Community. University of Tennessee Press, 2006.

External links
 3HO Foundation - 3HO
 3HO in the Light of Experience, Juan F Lafontaine, Finland (2016)
 Sikh Dharma International

New religious movements
Non-profit organizations based in New Mexico
Religious organizations established in 1969
Religious organizations based in the United States
Religions that require vegetarianism
Sikh groups and sects
Sikhism in the United States